Neighbours is an Australian television soap opera created by Reg Watson. It was first broadcast on 18 March 1985. The following is a list of characters that first appeared in the serial in 1999, by order of first appearance. All characters were introduced by the show's then executive producer Stanley Walsh. The 15th season of Neighbours began airing from 18 January 1999. Bess O'Brien, the mother of established character Sarah Beaumont, was introduced in February. May saw the arrival of Peter Hannay, while Martin Chester began appearing from July. Daniel Fitzgerald, Teabag Teasdale and Teresa Bell arrived in September. Charlie Thorpe debuted in October, along with the five-strong Scully family consisting of parents Joe and Lyn, and their daughters Stephanie, Felicity and Michelle.

Bess O'Brien

Bess O'Brien, played by Diana McLean, made her first screen appearance on 8 February 1999. McLean was happy to take on the role of Bess and said the cast and crew made her feel welcomed on set. Bess is Sarah Beaumont's (Nicola Charles) mother. She came to Erinsborough to visit her daughter, but their reunion was not entirely happy, as they had some issues to deal with first. McLean explained, "Bess is a highly dedicated environmental campaigner. Over the years she has spent more of her time fighting for various causes than she has bringing up her own daughter." McLean said it was not easy for Bess to make things up with Sarah, but Bess was "a determined lady." Realising that Sarah had been through some tough times, Bess wanted to be there for her.

Bess comes to Erinsborough to give a talk and to see her daughter, Sarah. Bess tells Sarah's friends that she had named her daughter Chakira Sunshine, while her sister Catherine (Radha Mitchell) was named Chandra Rain. They had both changed their names when they started school. Bess stay with Sarah, who confides in her about her bad year, which culminated in her dismissal from her job at the hospital. Bess speaks to the director of nursing at the Hospital and gets Sarah's appeal brought forward. Bess befriends Susan Kennedy (Jackie Woodburne) and learns that Sarah had an affair with Susan's husband. Sarah becomes frustrated with her mother and when Bess suggests that maybe she should get a job with Greenpeace. A furious Sarah tells Bess that she wants to help people. She then admits how angry she and Catherine were at Bess for never being there for them while they were growing up. Bess cooks dinner for Sarah as a peace offering, and Sarah forgives her.

Bess and Sarah go to the country together to visit some of Bess's friends. Back in Erinsborough, Bess receives a call asking her to attend a conference in New Zealand. Realising that her daughter needs her, Bess decides to stay with her. Bess helps Sarah raise money for a hospital fundraiser and helps Sarah's housemate Joel Samuels (Daniel MacPherson) get his job back. Bess is grateful that she has mended the rift between her and Sarah and she leaves for home. A few months later, Bess sends her friend Peter Hannay (Nick Carrafa) to visit Sarah and they become engaged. Bess fails to make it to the wedding after missing her flight.

Peter Hannay

Peter Hannay, played by Nick Carrafa, made his first screen appearance on 17 May 1999. Carrafa previously appeared in Neighbours as Tony Romeo in 1987. As Peter, Carrafa had a twelve-week guest contract with the show. Peter was introduced as a love interest for established character Sarah Beaumont (Nicola Charles). Carrafa said that Peter knew Sarah's mother and when mentioned that he was going to be spending time in Erinsborough, she told him to visit her daughter. Carrafa explained, "We go to a restaurant, have a good time and talk about the things we have in common. The relationship goes from there."

Following a "whirlwind romance", Peter and Sarah became engaged. Sarah initially had reservations about marrying Peter, as she still had feelings for Karl Kennedy (Alan Fletcher). However, she and a "lovestruck" Peter exchanged vows and married a month later. Peter almost caught Sarah sharing a goodbye kiss with Karl, before they departed for their new life overseas on 13 July 1999. When Charles returned to Neighbours in 2013, she revealed that Sarah and Peter had two children and had since separated.

Carrafa briefly reprised the role for "a surprise return" in November 2016. Peter returns to Erinsborough to collect his son Angus Beaumont-Hannay (Jai Waetford) and escort him to Sydney. Angus is angry with Peter for not caring that he went missing on the Gold Coast. Peter apologises for not being there for him and they reconcile. Peter thanks Karl and Susan for taking care of Angus. He tells Karl that he will be based in Sydney for the foreseeable future, as he has a job with the Flying Doctors.

A writer for Inside Soap called Peter "dashing" and "hunky". Another columnist hoped Peter was the one doctor to "finally mend Sarah's broken heart."

Martin Chester

Martin Chester, played by Gil Tucker, made his first screen appearance on 29 July 1999. Martin was an old friend of Karl (Alan Fletcher) and Susan Kennedy (Jackie Woodburne). After he arrived in town, he took Susan out to dinner. While Karl was aware that his friend and his wife were out to dinner, he did not think Susan would be capable of cheating on him. Woodburne explained, "Susan is very attracted to Martin, but she wouldn't be aware of it if her marriage was more solid and she wasn't feeling so unloved." Woodburne added that Susan was attempted to have an affair with Martin, but she ultimately wanted her marriage to survive. Woodburne was good friends with Tucker before his Neighbours appearance, having appeared with him in Cop Shop thirteen years previously. She thought their friendship made it easier to play ex-lovers on-screen.

Martin is an old university friend of Karl and Susan Kennedy. Martin had been a member of Karl's band The Right Prescription and had dated briefly dated Susan. When Martin comes to Erinsborough as part of his job, he comes into contact with Susan and they grow close. Martin explains that he has recently split up from his wife, while Susan was recovering from Karl's affair. After spending a few evenings together, and with Karl away, Martin admits to Susan that he is in love with her. Karl is pleased to see Martin and insists on taking him out to lunch, so they can catch up. Martin and Susan meet up in secret to talk about things. They are spotted by Tad Reeves (Jonathon Dutton) and Susan realises that it would look bad to Karl if he found out. When Karl suggests reforming The Right Prescription, Martin tells him he is leaving for Alice Springs. Susan later admits to Karl that she was tempted to have an affair with Martin.

Daniel Fitzgerald

Daniel "Dan" Fitzgerald, played by Brett Tucker, made his first screen appearance on 1 September 1999. Tucker played the role of high school teacher Dan for a brief period. His major story arc was a romance with his housemate Tess Bell (Krista Vendy). Tess had a crush on Dan, but was heartbroken when he dated Steph Scully (Carla Bonner). When Tess eventually told Dan about her crush, he admitted that he liked her too, but did not want to pursue his feelings as she was married. Dan later moved out to give their relationship a chance. Vendy was unsure if the storyline would continue as Tucker was not a regular cast member. Tucker reprised his role in 2007, when Neighbours shifted its focus back to character driven storylines and family values. Dan took on a counselling role at the high school. Michael Lallo from The Age said Tucker raised "the hunk quotient" as Dan.

Teabag Teasdale

John "Teabag" Teasdale, played by Nathan Phillips, made his first screen appearance on 3 September 1999. Phillips made his acting debut on Neighbours. He was a drama student at the time of his casting, and had only just decided to become an actor. His character was meant to have one line, but he was later given a two-month contract. Sacha Molitorisz from The Sydney Morning Herald thought Teabag was "unlikely". Tony Johnston, author of Neighbours: 20 years of Ramsay Street, wrote that Teabag was, for a time, the show's "resident bad boy" and that he was "nothing but trouble". Phillips later said that he still gets recognised for his role as Teabag.

John Teasdale or Teabag, befriends Hannah Martin (Rebecca Ritters), Paul McClain (Jansen Spencer) and Tad Reeves (Jonathon Dutton) after they turn a local allotment into a BMX track. Tad tells Teabag that he is going to make a film about BMXing and Teabag agrees to help. He throws a brick through the window of Grease Monkeys as part of the opening shot, and he and the others have to run when the police turn up. Teabag is impressed by Hannah when he sees her performing some BMX moves. He gives her his old BMX bike as a gift and they grow closer. When Hannah learns that her family are planning to move away, she becomes desperate to find somewhere to stay in Erinsborough. Teabag offers her a place at his share house. Paul is not happy with Hannah's growing relationship with Teabag and he confronts him, which leads to Teabag punching Paul.

Teabag brags about committing several local robberies and he later admits to Hannah that he broke into Billy Kennedy's (Jesse Spencer) workshop. Hannah, Paul and Tad tell Billy the truth and he reports Teabag to the police. Realising that Teabag is not the guy she thought he was, she decides to move away with her family. Teabag learns that Paul and Tad told Billy about the robbery and he makes their lives difficult by harassing them. He also admits to Hannah that the bike he gave her was stolen. Teabag continues to harass the Bishops by sitting in the Coffee Shop playing loud music and not ordering anything. He also phones in a fake order for food and cancels it once it is prepared. He also has a large number of pizzas sent to the Bishop house. Paul and Tad decide to get their own back by pulling apart Teabag's bike. Teabag goads them into returning to his house and Paul and Tad throws things at it. When Tad smashes one of the windows, a police car arrives and Teabag is pleased to get one over on them. Paul and Tad decide to stop trying to get even with Teabag. On Hannah's last day at school, Teabag gives her a bracelet and he gives up harassing the Bishops.

Teresa Bell

Teresa "Tess" Bell, played by Krista Vendy, made her first screen appearance on 17 September 1999. Vendy secured her audition for Neighbours through her agency. She auditioned three times in total and was one of three actresses up for the role. The actress learned that she had won the part of Teresa, or Tess, six months later. Tess was originally a barmaid called Tamsin Flynn, but after Vendy won the role, the producers decided to change the character's name and occupation. At the time of her introduction, Tess was a 24-year-old, married English teacher, who decided to move to Erinsborough to regain her independence. She found employment at the local high school. Despite being married, Tess developed a crush on her housemate Daniel Fitzgerald (Brett Tucker). Gina Leros of The Sun-Herald said Vendy would be the one to watch in Neighbours throughout 2000.

Charlie Thorpe

Charlie Thorpe, played by Katrina Baylis, made her first screen appearance on 8 October 1999. Following a "whirlwind romance" with fellow student Toadfish Rebecchi (Ryan Moloney), Charlie asked him to marry her. Moloney said Toadie was shocked by the proposal, and while he believed it was too soon, he accepted. Moloney believed that one of the reasons Toadie fell for Charlie was that he was on the rebound. He added that Toadie had never met someone like Charlie before and the more she pursued him, the more Toadie fell in love with her. Baylis said that Charlie was just using Toadie, as her work visa was running out. Of her character, the actress commented "You never know what to expect from Charlie. She's sweet and fun-loving one minute, then cold and calculating the next."

After Toadfish Rebecchi loses his dog, Bob, he goes to the local pound, but comes away with the wrong dog. He eventually comes across a woman in the park walking a similar looking dog to Bob. She explains that the dog is called Fluff, and belongs to her flatmate. After checking the dog, Toadie realises that it is Bob and the two dogs are exchanged back. Toadie then has a coffee with the woman, who introduces herself as Charlie. Toadie later spots Charlie at the university, and she tells him that she is from London and is studying law in Australia. Charlie tells Toadie about her ex-boyfriend, Rupert (Craig Blumeris), who she is still sharing a house with. Charlie later shows up at Toadie's house and tells him that Rupert refuses to move out. Charlie asks Toadie if she can stay with him and he agrees. When Toadie tries to kiss her, Charlie pulls away, making it clear that she is not ready. Charlie realises Toadie's housemate, Joel (Daniel MacPherson), is not happy with her staying, and she leaves.

Charlie later apologises for her behaviour and offers to cook for Toadie at his house. Joel becomes suspicious of Charlie, and he and Lance Wilkinson (Andrew Bibby) fall out with Toadie, when he invites Charlie to move in. When Charlie turns up with her stuff, Joel and Lance explain that she cannot move in. Charlie then goes to Toadie and claims that Joel and Lance had been rude to her, worsening the rift between them. Toadie and Charlie find a flat together, and Charlie later proposes to him. Toadie takes some time to think about it and then proposes to Charlie himself. Charlie later subtly drops her visa problems into the conversation and Toadie realises that she wants to marry him to stay in the country. Rupert also warns Toadie that he is making a mistake and shows Toadie a love letter from Charlie. Toadie confronts her and he learns that Charlie is not a student at the university and that she does not love him. Charlie then walks out of Toadie's life forever.

Joe Scully

Joe Scully, played by Shane Connor, made his first screen appearance on 20 October 1999. Connor was invited to audition for the role of Joe by the show's producers. Connor decided to accept when he learned that there was a chance he work with Janet Andrewartha, who played Joe's wife Lyn. The character also offered Connor a chance to play someone other than a bad guy or "a man on the verge." Connor was contracted with Neighbours for three years, with 12-month options. Joe was a builder and Connor said, "He's the only one who isn't so easy to get along with. Well, he is, as long as you don't get on the wrong side of him. He doesn't really care what people think." Andrew Mercado, author of Super Aussie Soaps, described Joe as being a "permanently missing-in-action" character.

Lyn Scully

Lynette "Lyn" Scully, played by Janet Andrewartha, made her first screen appearance on 20 October 1999. Andrewartha asked her agent to find her a role that would keep her in Melbourne, so she could be with her children. Six months later, Andrewartha's agent suggested she try out for Neighbours, and Andrewartha talked to producers, did a screen test and was offered the role of Lyn. The actress said her character did not feel good enough for Erinsborough and tried hard to fit in. This caused some conflict between Lyn and her husband, Joe (Shane Connor). Guy Davis from The Newcastle Herald observed Lyn's "vulnerability and messiness" resonated with viewers. The actress added "She's imperfect but she keeps trying. Marriages break up, businesses fall over, this happens, that happens, but Lyn keeps pulling her socks up and giving it another go."

Stephanie Scully

Stephanie Jo "Steph" Scully, played by Carla Bonner, made her first screen appearance on 20 October 1999. Before Bonner was cast in the role, actress Emma Roche was initially contracted to play Stephanie. However, Roche unexpectedly quit the role after three weeks. Bonner auditioned twice, before landing the part. Reporters for eBroadcast wrote that Steph was the eldest of the Scully siblings, and she preferred leathers and motorbikes to the hobbies of her friends. Steph was a tomboy and a "straight shooter". She had plenty of male admirers upon her arrival and she quickly became best friends with Libby Kennedy (Kym Valentine). In June 2002, Steph came first in a poll run by Newsround to find viewers' favourite Neighbours character. She received 34.85% of the vote. Steph was voted viewers favourite Neighbours character in a survey carried out by website Yahoo! in 2010.

Felicity Scully

Felicity Jane "Flick" Scully, played by Holly Valance, made her first screen appearance on 20 October 1999. Valance did not have much experience auditioning prior to Neighbours. She learned that she had won the part of Felicity three months later. Of her reaction to finding out she had the part, Valance said "I never would have [believed it]. You know the show that I've been watching since I was two years old and been such a huge fan. Not in a million years would I thought I would be a part of." Neighbours was Valance's first major television role. She was sixteen when she was cast as Felicity, one year older than her character. Felicity was "a devoted feminist" and someone who had a "very active social conscience." For her portrayal of Felicity, Valance was nominated for the Most Popular New Female Talent Logie Award in 2000.

Michelle Scully

Michelle Scully, played by Kate Keltie, made her first screen appearance on 20 October 1999. Keltie was thirteen when she was cast as the youngest Scully sibling Michelle. She was a year older than the character she portrayed. Reporters for eBroadcast said Michelle had "an over-active imagination." While Keltie branded Michelle a spoilt little princess, who looked like butter would not melt. Keltie told Alison James of Soaplife, "She's actually wild and thinks she can get away with anything. She also has a mad imagination which means she tells very convincing fibs." Michelle was close to her father and, a writer for the BBC's Neighbours website observed that she was "very mature, very clever, and very determined." Shortly after her arrival, Michelle developed a crush on neighbour Paul McClain (Jansen Spencer).

Others

References

External links
Characters and cast at the Official AU Neighbours website
Characters and cast at the Official UK Neighbours website
Characters and cast at the Internet Movie Database

1999
, Neighbours